The Business, Energy and Industrial Strategy Committee is a select committee of the House of Commons in the Parliament of the United Kingdom. The remit of the committee is to examine the expenditure, administration and policy of the Department for Business, Energy and Industrial Strategy, and any departmental bodies.

The committee came into existence as the Business, Innovation and Skills Committee on 1 October 2009, replacing the Business and Enterprise Select Committee, which was dissolved on 30 September 2009. The House of Commons agreed to the committee's establishment on 25 June 2009, following Prime Minister Gordon Brown's replacement of the Department for Business, Enterprise and Regulatory Reform with the Department for Business, Innovation and Skills on 5 June 2009. Following the merger of the Department of Energy and Climate Change and the Department for Business, Innovation and Skills in July 2016, the name of the committee was changed in October 2016 to reflect the name of the new department.

Membership
The committee's chair until the 2017 general election was Iain Wright, elected on 18 June 2015. The other members of the committee were formally appointed on 8 July 2015.  On 12 July 2017, Rachel Reeves was elected chair of the committee until her elevation to the Shadow Cabinet, when Darren Jones was elected her successor.

As of 29 November 2022, the membership is as follows:

Changes since 2019

2017-2019
The chair was elected on 12 July 2017, with the members of the committee being announced on 11 September 2017.

Changes 2017-2019

Previous changes
Occasionally, the House of Commons ordered changes to be made in terms of membership of the select committee, as proposed by the Committee of Selection. Such changes are shown below.

Notable reports 
In July 2022, the committee published its report "Energy pricing and the future of the energy market" which examined the turmoil in retail energy arising from unusually high wholesale gas prices, leading to the collapse of several suppliers and the need for government support of Bulb Energy. The committee found that the industry regulator Ofgem had been incompetent in its supervision of the finances of supplier companies, and that the government overlooked this lack of supervision because it prioritised competition over market regulation. The report also criticised Ofgem's design of the energy price cap, recommending that the government consider introducing a social tariff; stated that the government's May 2022 support package for customers was no longer sufficient; and criticised the absence of a home insulation programme.

In response, Ofgem accepted that its previous financial resilience regime was not sufficiently robust, and had contributed to some of the supplier failures since August 2021.

References

External links
Records for the Business, Innovation and Skills Committee (2009-2016) are held at the Parliamentary Archives
 

Department for Business, Innovation and Skills
Select Committees of the British House of Commons
United Kingdom industrial planning policy